The Story of Molly X is a 1949 American film noir crime film directed by Crane Wilbur and starring June Havoc, John Russell and Dorothy Hart. The screenplay concerns a woman who tries to reform after being sent to prison, but faces obstacles.

Plot
After her husband is killed, a woman executes a series of robberies with her husband's gang while searching for his murderer.

Cast
 June Havoc as Molly X
 John Russell as Cash Brady
 Dorothy Hart as Anne
 Connie Gilchrist as Dawn
 Cathy Lewis as Jan
 Sara Berner as Amy
 Sandra Gould as Vera
 Katherine Warren as Norma Calvert (as Katharine Warren)
 Charles McGraw as Police Capt. Breen
 Elliott Lewis as Rod Markle
 Wally Maher as Chris Renbow

Reception
Bosley Crowther, critic for The New York Times, was unimpressed, writing, "there is little of substance or excitement in 'The Story of Molly X.'" He found the story  and actors unconvincing: "... this film ... carries a great deal more sentiment than conviction. Miss Havoc may look mighty sweet but she certainly does not overwhelm you with a sense of her cold recalcitrance ... And the females with whom she is surrounded in this penal institute seem not much more wicked or unsocial than the young ladies in a Connecticut finishing school."

See also
 List of American films of 1949

References

External links
 
 
 

1949 crime drama films
Film noir
American black-and-white films
American crime drama films
American prison drama films
Women in prison films
Films directed by Crane Wilbur
1949 films
Universal Pictures films
1940s American films